The 2008 Chicago Fire season was the club's 13th year of existence, as well as their 11th season in Major League Soccer and 11th consecutive year in the top-flight of American soccer. It began with a 3-1 away win over Real Salt Lake on March 29, 2008 and ended with a 2-1 loss to Columbus Crew in the Eastern Conference Final on November 13, 2008.  Denis Hamlett made his debut as the Chicago Fire coach after being promoted.

Current roster

Squad
 Players in bold have had senior international caps for their respective national squads.

 (Vice-captain)
 

 (Captain)

Transfers

In
 Patrick Nyarko Drafted 7th overall in 2008 MLS Superdraft
 Dominic Cervi Drafted 12th overall in 2008 MLS Superdraft
 Peter Lowry Drafted 26th overall in 2008 MLS Superdraft
 Dwight Barnett Drafted 38th overall in 2008 MLS Superdraft
 Stephen King Drafted 40th overall in 2008 MLS Superdraft
 Austin Washington Drafted 54th overall in 2008 MLS Superdraft
 Andy Herron Rights acquired from Columbus Crew for 4th round pick in the 2010 Superdraft 
 Tomasz Frankowski  Signed from  Wolverhampton Wanderers
 Brandon Prideaux Acquired in waiver draft from Colorado Rapids
 Líder Mármol Signed as free agent.
 Brian McBride Free agent

Out
 Matt Pickens To  Queens Park Rangers
 Iván Guerrero Lost to San Jose Earthquakes in the Expansion Draft
 Jim Curtin Traded to Chivas USA
 Chris Armas Retired
 Paulo Wanchope Retired
 Jeff Curtin Waived, later signed with D.C. United
 Osei Telesford Waived, later signed with  Puerto Rico Islanders
 Chad Barrett Traded to Toronto FC in Brian McBride deal
 Brian Plotkin Waived, later signed with Columbus Crew

Club

Management

Other information

Statistics

Appearances and goals
Last updated on June 5, 2008.

|}

Competitions

Overall

Major League Soccer

Standings

Results summary

Matches

MLS regular season

MLS Cup Playoffs

U.S. Open Cup

Friendlies

References

Chicago Fire FC seasons
Chicago Fire
Chi
Chicago Fire